Montezuma is an unincorporated community in Chester County, Tennessee.

Geography
The community is situated on Tennessee State Route 225.

History

The area now known as Montezuma was first settled in about 1820. Joseph Johnson, Wesley and Nehemiah Burkhead were among the first settlers. The first store in Montezuma was owned by J. R. Wamble. 
In the 1850s and 1860s when the railroad was being built in West Tennessee the people of Montezuma did not want it built through their community. The railroad was therefore routed through Henderson, which over time became the larger community.
Montezuma was a part of McNairy County until Chester County was formed. Montezuma and Henderson were both proposed as the County Seat for the newly formed Chester County, but Henderson won by a large margin.
In July 1975 the Montezuma Post Office was discontinued and consolidated with the Post Office in Henderson.

References 

Chester County Tennessee History and Families 1882 - 1995, Copyright 1995 Chester County Historical Society
 History of Montezuma Tennessee 
 A Brief History of Chester County

Unincorporated communities in Chester County, Tennessee
Unincorporated communities in Tennessee
Jackson metropolitan area, Tennessee